Speed Kills is a 2018 American crime drama film directed by Jodi Scurfield and starring John Travolta.  It is based on Arthur J. Harris's book of the same name about the life of Donald Aronow, fictionalized as "Ben Aronoff".

Cast
 John Travolta as Ben Aronoff
 Katheryn Winnick as Emily Gowen
 Jennifer Esposito as Katherine Aronoff
 Michael Weston as Shelly Katz
 Jordi Mollà as Jules Bergman
 Amaury Nolasco as Agent Lopez
 Matthew Modine as George H. W. Bush
 James Remar as Meyer Lansky
 Kellan Lutz as Robbie Reemer
 Charlie Gillespie as Andrew Aronoff
 Moran Atias as Contessa
 Tom Sizemore as Dwayne Franklin
 Mike Massa as "Knocky" House
 Luis Da Silva as "Panama"
 Keith Hudson as "Dutch" Kramer

Reception
Barbara Shulgasser-Parker of Common Sense Media awarded it one star out of five. Simon Abrams of RogerEbert.com awarded it half a star. Powerboat Racing World website told their readers to 'prepare for disappointment'.

References

External links

2018 crime drama films
2010s English-language films
2010s Spanish-language films
Saban Films films
Films based on non-fiction books
Boat racing films
American crime drama films
Puerto Rican films
2010s American films